Athanasios Argianas (born 1976) is a Greek and British artist living and working in London, England. Argianas' practice is interdisciplinary; incorporating sculpture, painting, text, performance and often music or sound, and concerns itself with metaphorical or translated representations of aural experiences. He received his MA from Goldsmiths College, London and previously studied under Jannis Kounellis at the Kunstakademie Düsseldorf.

Life and works
Athanasios Argianas was born in 1976 in Athens, Greece. In addition to his fine arts education and practice, Argianas is a conservatory trained musician and releases music under the moniker Gavouna. In his work, Argianas has been known to reference electronic instruments from the early 20th century, such as the theremin and the ondes martenot, experimental music and compositional methods from the 1960s, concrete poetry, the Constructivism of Naum Gabo, and even Marcel Duchamp’s Machine Optique (1920) and its circular deployment of language.

Argianas' work explores the contingency of sounds and forms and the possibility of new or different understanding arising through the translation between aural and material experiences. He oscillates between employing standardized systems for converting sound to object in some works and allowing for more intuitive translation in others. 
"Argianas makes objects that can be used for performances that in turn produce data which to define the shape of future objects." His work has been exhibited internationally, including solo exhibitions at the National Museum of Contemporary Art Athens, The Serpentine Gallery, London and a participation in Performa 13 in New York.

Notable solo exhibitions
2021: "Hollowed Water" ARCH, Athens. https://artreview.com/athanasios-argianas-hollowed-water-review/
2020: "Hollowed Water", Camden Arts Centre, London. https://archive.camdenartscentre.org/archive/d/hollowed-water
2016:"readingmachinesmovingmachines" On Stellar Rays, New York, NY, USA 
2014: Silence Breakers, Silence Shapers, Galerie Gabriel Rolt, Amsterdam, The Netherlands 
2014: A Sequencer**, Aanant & Zoo, Berlin, Germany 
2013: A Sequencer*, On Stellar Rays, New York, NY, USA 
2011: Laid Long, Spun Thin, Max Wigram Gallery, London, UK 
2011: The Length of Your Arms Unfolded, Performance and Installation, The Barbican Art Gallery, The Barbican Center, London, UK 
2010: Art Nova, Art Basel Miami (with Pavel Büchler), FL, USA 
2010: The Length of a Strand of Your Hair, of the Width of Your Arms, Unfolded, EMST, National Museum of Contemporary Art, Athens, Greece
2008: We All Turn This Way, Park Nights, Serpentine Gallery Pavilion (with Nick Laessing), The Serpentine Gallery, London, UK

Notable group exhibitions
2020: 'HOLLOWED WATER' Camden Arts Centre, London, UK 
2017: ANTIDORON. The EMST Collection, documenta 14, Fridericianum, Kassel, Germany 
 2016: The Promise of Total Automation, Kunsthalle Wien, Vienna, Austria 
 2016: Line, Lisson Gallery, London, UK
2014: Art of Its Own Making, The Pulitzer Museum, St. Louis, MO, USA 
2014: Art or Sound, Fondazione Prada - Ca Corner Della Regina, Venice, Italy 
2013: Performa 13, Biennial, New York, NY, USA 
2013: In the Studio, Kunsthalle Athena, Athens, Greece
2012: The Imminence of Poetics, Curated by Luis Perez-Oramas, The 30th Sao Paulo Biennale, Sao Paulo, Brazil 
2012: Coquilles Mécaniques, Cracalsace, Centre Rhénan d’Art Contemporain, Altkirch, France
2012: Sonic Time Speech / Sound / Silence From the EMST Collection, curated bz Anna Kafetsi, EMST National Museum of Contemporary Art, Athens, Greece
2011: A Rock and a Hard Place, 3rd Thessaloniki Biennale of Contemporary Art, Greece 
2011: Art Now Live 2011, Tate Britain, London, UK 
2010/11: Recent British Sculpture, Curated by Tom Morton, Grimm Gallery, Amsterdam, The Netherlands
2007: Pale Carnage, Curated by Martin Clark, Arnolfini, Bristol, UK (touring to Dundee Contemporary Arts, Dundee, UK)

References

External links
 Athanasios Argianas' website
 Represented by Aanant & Zoo, Berlin
 Represented by Max Wigram Gallery, London
 Represented by On Stellar Rays, New York
 Interview with Athanasios Argianas
 Review of Argianas' exhibition at EMST in Frieze Magazine
 "Frames of Reference", Curator Chris Sharp on Argianas
 "The Length of a strand of your hair, of the width of your arms", daily serving 2010
 Athanasios Argianas to Julian Elias Bronner, artforum 2013
 "abc 2014" by Marlena Fiestelmann, auctionata 2014

Greek contemporary artists
1976 births
Living people
Artists from Athens